The ExPlace Wind Turbine is a  tall wind turbine located on the grounds of the Exhibition Place co-owned by the WindShare for-profit co-operative and Toronto Hydro. It is the first wind turbine installed in a major North American urban city centre, and the first community-owned wind power project in Ontario. WindShare itself was officially launched in February 2002 in Toronto, Ontario, Canada. It was created by the non-profit Toronto Renewable Energy Co-operative (TREC) which was incorporated in 1998. TREC continues to exist as a separate non-profit entity.

History 
In 1998, the Toronto Renewable Energy Co-operative (TREC) was incorporated. The next year in 1999, the TREC received a grant to study three potential sites for an urban wind turbine project in Toronto. On June 30, 1999, the TREC formed an ad hoc partnership with Toronto Hydro to build wind turbines in Toronto. In February 2002, the TREC officially launched the WindShare co-operative with the policy of asking members of the non-profit TREC to become members of the for-profit WindShare co-operative.

From December 16 to 18, 2002, the WindShare's ExPlace wind turbine was erected. It is the first wind turbine installed in a major North American urban city centre, and the first community-owned wind power project in Ontario. On January 23, 2003, the ExPlace turbine began generating electricity. In 2006, the Government of Ontario introduced a feed-in tariff. As a part of the Green Energy Act, the feed-in tariff was revised by the Government of Ontario.

In the summer of 2012, the turbine was brought offline due to problems with the converter, the part of the turbine that converts the movement of the blades of the turbine into electricity. The converter was replaced and the turbine was brought back online in March 2013. Again in July 2014, the new converter had issues, causing the turbine to go offline until October of the same year while the issues were resolved.

In March 2017, water damaged the wind turbine's ring generator during a storm, causing the wind turbine to stop operating. Toronto Hydro took until August 2017 to fund a specialist firm to begin the required repairs as well as other upgrades to the turbine with work originally expected to be completed by November of the same year. In February 2019, the turbine finally became operational again.

Technical details 
The rotor and reach a speed of approximately 24.5 rpm. Construction of the turbine cost approximately CAD$1.8 million (including foundation, interconnect, and erection).

The wind turbine adds an average of 1000 MWh of electricity to the city's main power grid per year.

See also 

 List of wind farms in Canada
 Community wind energy
 Ontario Sustainable Energy Association

References

External links

 Toronto Renewable Energy Co-operative (TREC)
 WindShare
 Ontario Sustainable Energy Association
 Ontario Power Authority "Standard Offer Program" (SOP) for Wind Energy Projects
 Ontario Power Authority Feed-in Tariff program for renewable energy 

Energy cooperatives
Cooperatives in Canada